Temasek Cares CLG Ltd is a Singaporean non-profit philanthropic organisation set up in 2009 to commemorate the 35th anniversary of Temasek Holdings.

Backed by four endowments, Temasek Cares aims to improve the lives of underprivileged individuals, families, and communities in Singapore .

Temasek Cares funds programmes that contribute to the well-being, dignity, and livelihood of the underprivileged in Singapore through its four thrusts of "building people", "building community", "building capability", and "rebuilding lives".

It has aided nearly 17,600 individuals in Singapore over the last five years.

History
In March 2014, Temasek up a new endowment fund of S$40 million to commemorate its 40th anniversary. The new Temasek Emergency Preparedness Fund (T-PREP Fund), administered by Temasek Cares, will help with programmes to enable people to be prepared and cope with different emergency situations.

2013/2014

In 2013/2014, S$6.7 million were committed to supporting 4,750 beneficiaries through 18 new programmes. New initiatives for the year included programmes that support children with learning and development delays, programmes that support educational support for youths, and programmes that help adults with mental challenges.

2012/2013

In 2012/2013, S$4.55 million in grants were committed to 14 programmes including new and differentiated models of care for over 4,700 Singaporeans and their families. Various stakeholders including voluntary welfare organisations (VWOs), government agencies, sector administrators, and grassroots organisations worked together to provide intervention for children with learning needs from socially challenged families.

2011/2012

In 2011/2012, more than S$3.33 million were committed to fund 15 programmes for more than 3,750 under-privileged individuals in Singapore. Supported programmes include those that reach out to Singaporeans with mental challenges, children with learning and developmental delays, abused women and their children, and frail elderly requiring long-term care.

2010/2011

In 2010/2011, Temasek Cares committed grants of S$3.07 million in total to support 3,000 direct beneficiaries through 15 programmes, of which 11 were new or pilot programmes. Attention was given to support programmes to build the intermediate and long-term care sector, including study awards to train more nurses and allied health professionals and those that provide integrated care within the community for the elderly. Focus was also given to  build the special needs sector,  like study awards to train early-intervention teachers and therapists, train parents of children with learning needs, and provide learning support specialists for Northlight School and Assumption Pathway School. One key programme for that year was Project SPARK, which brought the four major community self-help groups together to help single parents and their children rebuild their lives. Other supported programmes include establishing bursaries to help needy children with their education expenses, and bursaries that help ex-offenders upgrade their skills and improve their chances of employment.

2009/2010
Temasek Cares CLG Ltd was founded in 2009 through a grant of S$100 million to the Temasek Trust, an initial endowment gift to fund Singapore community programmes. An additional endowment of $70 million - renamed as the Ee Peng Liang Endowment and the Balaji Sadasivan Endowment - was received on its first anniversary. The S$35 million Ee Peng Liang Endowment is designated for building the capability of the special needs sector.

The S$35 million Balaji Sadasivan Endowment is focused on building the capability of the intermediate and long-term care sector to meet the needs of an ageing population. Supported programmes include study awards for nurses and therapists, as well as those that help the elderly to age in place.

Board of Directors

Chairman
 Mr Richard R Magnus PPA (E) (L), PBM 
 Served the Legal Service for 40 years
 Conferred the Public Administration Medal (GoldBar) and the Meritorious Service Medal for his contributions to the Singapore Judiciary in 2003 and 2009 respectively
 Chairman, Casino Regulatory Authority of Singapore
 Chairman, Public Transport Council 
 Chairman, Bioethics Advisory Committee
 Chairman, Public Guardian Board

Treasurer
 Mr Mohd Salleh Marican-Chief Executive Officer, Second Chance Properties Ltd
 Founded Second Chance Properties Ltd and has been the Chairman and CEO since its incorporation
 Has 35 years of retail experience
 Recipient of the Nanyang Technological University Entrepreneurship Excellence Award (1996)

Board Members
 Ms Pang Cheng Lian, Retired. Ms Pang graduated with a Master of Arts in Political Science from the University of Singapore. She held various positions and responsibilities including:
 Chairman, Films Appeal Committee
 Singapore's Ambassador to Italy and Switzerland (non-resident) 
 First Vice President/Special Assistant to the Chairman Dr Wee Cho Yaw, United Overseas Bank
 Director of United Industrial Corporation Limited
 Appointed Director of Singapore Land Limited
 Mr Zainul Abidin Rasheed. Zainul has served various positions in the media, community development programmes/institutions, the trade union movement and Government. He served as the Senior Minister of State in the Ministry of Foreign Affairs until 2011. His current portfolio includes:
 Non-Resident Ambassador to Kuwait 
 Consultant with the New Straits Times Press 
 Corporate Advisor with Temasek
 Ms Vemala K Rajamanickam - Consultant, Allen & Gledhill LLP
 Partner and Consultant in Allen & Gledhill since 1977
 Advocate and solicitor of the Supreme Court of Singapore since 1971, until she retired in 2009
 Mr Benedict Cheong - Director & Chief Executive Officer, Temasek Foundation 
 CEO of Temasek Foundation
 Previously CEO of the National Council of Social Service
 Served in the Singapore Police Force for 15 years in various appointments at headquarters and in the operational units
 Mr Goh Yong Siang Senior - Managing Director, Hexagon Development Advisors Pte Ltd
 Joined Temasek in August 2006 until 2013
 Previously worked in the private equity sector and was President of ST Engineering
 Served in the Singapore Armed Forces, retiring as Chief of the Air Force in 1998

Management Team
 Ms Woon Saet Nyoon - General Manager
 Mr Kee Kirk Chuen - Deputy General Manager

Programmes and Partnership
Temasek Cares partners with various established organisations to support existing programmes or to develop new programmes. Its programmes fall under four key thrusts:

Building People
Temasek Cares – Education Bursary Programme for Eurasian students: Temasek Cares partnered the Eurasian Association to help  Eurasian primary school students from low-income families with school-related expenses including school fees, uniforms, books, transportation to and from school, and meals during recess. The programme reached out to families who do not qualify for existing financial assistance schemes offered by the Eurasian Association or the Government, to motivate the children to continue schooling and progress to the next level of education.

Bursary for ITE students: the Temasek Cares Bursary programme partnered with the Institute of Technical Education (ITE) to aid financially needy ITE students to do well in school and to complete their courses of study.

Bursary for APS Students: Temasek Cares partnered Assumption Pathway School (APS)  to award a bursary that helps financially needy students with school fees and other education-related expenses. The programme complements other financial assistance schemes provided by the school and the Singapore government and supports APS students from financially needy families annually.

Building Community

Temasek Cares - KITS (Kids in Tough Situation) and 'Stay Prepared':Temasek established the Temasek Emergency Preparedness Fund (TPREP Fund) with an endowment of S$40m to help build community resilience to emergencies.

The first programme under the TPREP Fund is the Temasek Cares KITS. This  pilot programme, developed in collaboration with KK Women's and Children's Hospital, aims to build up community capabilities to support and help vulnerable children who face emotional, behavioural and psychological difficulties, of mild to moderate severity, following a traumatic event.

The second programme, the 'Stay Prepared' Starter Kits programme, aims to help people in Singapore cope with emergencies and crisis situations through the distribution of 'Stay Prepared' Starter Kits to every household. Each starter kit contains three 3M™ N95 face masks, instructions on how to wear the masks and emergency contact numbers. The nationwide programme is a collaboration between Temasek Cares and Singapore Power, and supported by Singapore Post. In total, 1.2 million 'Stay Prepared' Starter Kits were distributed to all households in Singapore, and an additional 17,000 kits to charity homes in May 2014.

Temasek Cares - Project SPARK (Successful Parents and Resilient Kids): Project SPARK was launched in collaboration with four self-help groups (Yayasan Mendaki, Chinese Development Assistance Council, Singapore Indian Development Association, and Eurasian Association) to address the gaps in services for single parents and their children. The project was built around the CareerLink Plus programme, which helps single-parent families in rebuilding their lives and creating stronger family units by providing avenues of employment, skills training, financial support, and childcare for dependents. This is to encourage single parents, especially mothers, to assimilate back into the workforce.

Temasek Cares - CAN (Caring Assistance from Neighbours): Temasek Cares partnered the Agency for Integrated Care (AIC) to set up a two-year pilot programme known as CAN (Caring Assistance from Neighbours) to help 100 vulnerable seniors living alone better manage their health conditions. Under the programme, a network of trained community caregivers visit the elderly at home to monitor their health and provide assistance on a daily basis. They assist the elderly to understand their illness, remind them to take their medication, and measure key health indicators including blood pressure, heart rate, blood glucose, and weight. The pilot programme, which currently targets two districts with a high concentration of the senior citizens in the Taman Jurong and Bukit Merah areas, aims to expand the network of community caregivers to more districts.

Temasek Cares - iPAL  (integrated Promoters of Active Living)

In 2012, the Agency for Integrated Care (AIC), Khoo Teck Puat Hospital (KTPH), and Temasek Cares collaborated to launch iPAL (integrated Promoters of Active Living) to provide cognitive and stimulating activities at home to help the elderly with dementia to maintain their cognitive, physical, and mental functions.

The dementia team at KTPH provides a structured training curriculum to train care providers in dementia care. They also provide ongoing support to the care providers when needed to increase the capacity of the community in supporting the growing number of elderly with dementia.

The programme aims to serve 200 elderly and their caregivers over three years in the north of Singapore as part of the Temasek Cares - iCommunity@North programme, and it may be extended to more needy families across the island.

Building Capability
Temasek Cares – Kids Integrated Development Service (prenatal to 3 years old): a partnership between Temasek Cares, KK Women's and Children's Hospital (KKH), and Ang Mo Kio Family Service Centre (AMK FSC), KIDS 0-3 is a community-based programme to optimise the developmental potential of children from vulnerable families from pregnancy to 3 years old. The programme provides multi-layered, integrated medical, social and educational services which are critical for the development of children during the first three years of their lives. Through centre based services, home visiting services and community partnerships, it ensures that the child receives proper nutrition, good medical care, early stimulation and emotional security during his/her early years so that the child can attain a good start in school readiness. The mother is also provided for under the programme. She receives pre-natal and post-natal care as well as support for her social and mental well-being.

Temasek Cares - A PLUS (Academic Programme for Learning-Needs and Underprivileged Students): Temasek Cares partnered Yayasan MENDAKI to establish a two-year structured academic pilot programme to build the capability in two school-based student care centres for primary school students aged 7 – 14 with learning needs. Under the programme, each centre is resourced with more teachers and an external learning needs specialist engaging in social and emotional learning, to help students who are slower learners improve their literacy, numeracy, I.T. skills, social, and emotional competencies.

Temasek Cares - IMPACTT (Involving and Motivating Parents & Caregivers Through Training): Temasek Cares partnered with the KK Women's and Children's Hospital (KKH) to develop the IMPACTT programme to help parents learn new skills to better manage the behaviour in their child with special needs. Families receive training in 'Signposts' – a parenting programme designed by the Parenting Research Centre of Australia for families with children in the 3–15 years age group. The programme also complements other initiatives by Temasek Cares to support children with special needs including the Therapy Outreach Programme for Pre-schoolers (TOPPS) and the Ee Peng Liang - Special Needs Building Capability Project. Since 2011, over 1,500 parents have undergone training through IMPACTT. 184 personnel from early intervention centres, preschool centres, special schools, family service centres, and other voluntary welfare organisations have also been trained and certified as Signposts facilitators.

Temasek Cares - TRiC (Technology-assisted Rehabilitation in the Community): Temasek Cares partnered the Agency for Integrated Care (AIC) to launch the TRiC (Technology-assisted Rehabilitation in the Community) programme to enable Day Rehabilitation Centres (DRCs) to increase operational efficiency and improve clinical outcomes for patients in Singapore. The Agency for Integrated Care and Singapore Polytechnic (SP) worked on four projects that developed and test-bedded technologies that aim to increase the operational efficiency of the centres and improve clinical outcomes for patients.

Temasek Cares provided seed funding for the four projects. Prototypes are in the final stages of completion and user trials will commence in late 2013.

SP is working closely with DRCs operated by St. Andrew's Community Hospital and Asian Women's Welfare Association on the design and testing of equipment, and collecting feedback from patients and staff. Final prototypes are expected to be implemented over the next 1–2 years.

Transition-To-Work Programme for Disadvantaged Youth: In February 2013, Temasek Cares and Bizlink started a pilot programme  to help young school leavers to transit into the workplace. Funded under the Ee Peng Liang Endowment, this programme aims to serve 200 school leavers over two years. Under the programme, each school leaver undergoes a vocational assessment carried out by occupational therapists and psychologists at Bizlink. They are then placed in the jobs most suitable to them. Job coaches in the workplace will guide them to build a supportive work environment. The school leaver is further supported by teachers, family social workers, and alumni officers of participating schools such as Northlight School and Assumption Pathway School.

The Balaji Sadasivan - Healthcare Building Capability Project Building in Intermediate and Long-Term Care (ILTC) in Singapore.

Temasek Cares partnered with the Agency for Integrated Care (AIC) to establish the Balaji Sadasivan - Healthcare Building Capability Project offering study awards to help the Intermediate and Long-Term Care (ILTC) sector recruit and train more skilled manpower. The project is administered by the Agency for Integrated Care (AIC) and funded through the Balaji Sadasivan Endowment managed by Temasek Cares. The programme was established in response to the chronic shortage of therapists and nurses in the sector. Upon graduation, award recipients will serve in an approved ILTC institution of their choice in community hospitals, nursing homes, rehabilitation centres, and hospices for an agreed period of time.

Temasek Cares - iCommunity@North: Temasek Cares partnered with the Agency for Integrated Care (AIC) to launch iCommunity@North, a two-year programme that provides integrated medical and social services for elderly with dementia and mental illness in the northern part of Singapore. Agencies from social services, healthcare, and the community providing services through existing community support systems like senior activity centres, family service centres, wellness centres, general practitioners, and hospitals come together to form an integrated network. The services form a care continuum from education, prevention, early identification, intervention, and follow-up to home-based support. The implementation of the new mental health integrated network is expected to take five years and is delivered through teams known as Community Intervention Team (COMIT) and Community Resource, Engagement and Support Team (CREST).

The Thye Hua Kwan Moral Charities. Run the CREST programme, which focuses on increasing mental health awareness through outreach, recognising seniors with early signs and symptoms of dementia, and providing basic emotional support to clients and caregivers.

O'Joy Care services run the COMIT team which provides counselling, psychoeducation, and care coordination to clients as well as caregiver training and support.

Khoo Teck Puat Hospital (KTPH) supports the CREST programme and COMIT community partners by providing training and resource expertise support. At later phases, the work process and service models employed between these programmes and KTPH may be extended to other community-based services such as Dementia Day Care and Day Rehabilitation Centres.

Ee Peng Liang - Special Needs Building Capability Project (FY 2012/2013, FY 2010/2011)

Temasek Cares partnered with the National Council of Social Service (NCSS) to establish the Ee Peng Liang - Special Needs Building Capability Project that offers study awards to help the special needs sector recruit and train more skilled manpower. Award recipients are expected to have passion for social work, and agree to serve in an approved Voluntary Welfare Organisation for a period of time upon graduation. Since 2011, the project has given out 29 awards to students preparing to become physiotherapists, occupational therapists, speech therapists, and early intervention teachers. The project is administered by the National Council of Social Service and funded through the Ee Peng Liang Endowment managed by Temasek Cares.

Programmes for Students of Assumption Pathway School: Temasek Cares partnered with the Assumption Pathway School (APS) to award education bursaries to APS students from low-income families to help them with educational-related expenses. Temasek Cares also funds a programme to provide a family social worker to assist students from dysfunctional families. Under this programme, the family social worker will visit the students in their homes to help them overcome challenges which affect their emotional well-being and attendance at school. They support the school's existing counsellors and teachers, who focus on the academic, social, and emotional needs of the student. The family social workers assess the needs of the family, provide counselling, direct the family to available help schemes and programmes, and follow up on progress made. Learning support specialists, such as a literacy coach and an educational psychologist, help students with learning needs to better access the curriculum.

Programme to Support Students with Learning Needs to Cope with their Curriculum: in 2011, Temasek Cares partnered with the Assumption Pathway School (APS) and NorthLight School to set up a one-year pilot programme to help students with learning and developmental needs to cope with their curriculum. The programme provides the school with literacy coaches, an educational psychologist, diagnostic tools, and other resources as well as capability building of existing teachers. Students with low literacy skills would participate in a pull-out programme conducted by the literacy coaches to improve their reading and language skills.

Employment Support Services for Graduates of Metta School: Temasek Cares partnered with the Metta School to launch an employment service that helps Metta School graduates find jobs and to sustain their employment. A team of counsellors and job placement officers provide support to the graduates and track their progress in the workplace. Metta School, established in 2001, offers special education to children aged between seven and 18 who are diagnosed with mild intellectual disability and/or mild autism spectrum disorders. ITE-certified vocational courses in baking, food preparation, and housekeeping are offered to eligible students aged 17 and above through the Metta-ITE Skills Certification (ISC) two-year programme.

Temasek Cares – EQUATE (Equine-Assisted Training and Employment): together with the Equestrian Federation of Singapore, Temasek Cares developed the Temasek Cares - EQUATE programme, which creates new employment opportunities in the equine industry for people with special needs. The programme places persons with special needs in equine-related vocations such as stable hands, grooms, grounds keepers, and maintenance crew. Temasek Cares supports this programme with the cost of training and development of training pedagogy. The programme is complementary to the Temasek Cares - EQUAL programme, which provides equine therapy to disadvantaged youth.

Education Trust Fund/ Temasek Cares - Academic and Life Skills Coaching: Temasek Cares partnered with Yayasan MENDAKI to establish an academic and life skills coaching programme that helps equip Malay/Muslim students in ITE with academic and life skills. The aim of the programme is to help them to excel in school and obtain their NITEC certificate.

Ageing In Place @Tanjong Rhu: Temasek Cares partnered with the St Hilda's Community Services Centre to launch a pilot programme that provides community-based healthcare services through a neighbourhood rehabilitation centre and home visits to 240 elderly residents in Tanjong Rhu estate.

Temasek Cares - SPICE: the SPICE (Singapore Programme for the Integrated Care of the Elderly) pilot programme was developed together with the Agency for Integrated Care (AIC) to provide an alternative care solution to nursing homes through integrated and community-based medical, nursing, and social services for the elderly. Its initiatives include ramping up the facilities and providing health and personal care services at the Salvation Army Bedok Multi-Service Centre (Bedok MSC).  The improved facilities, enhanced services, and extended operating hours (7am-7pm) would then allow family members to continue work during the day and care for the elderly during the evenings and weekends. A multi-disciplinary team comprising nurses, therapists, case managers and health workers was formed to look after the care needs of the elderly. The team works closely with the patient's primary physician and helps to coordinate other services that are not available in-house. The elderly who participate in the pilot programme receive meals and take part in supervised exercise and recreation activities in addition to medical and nursing care.

Young Caregivers: Temasek Cares partnered with the HCA Hospice Care to launch a programme that nurtures the young to be caregivers to the elderly by helping them to develop a sense of empathy towards the elderly. Students from upper primary to tertiary level participate in educational workshops under their school's curriculum to interact with the elderly by visiting hospices and other centres for the elderly. Over two years since its inception, the programme has reached out to over 21,600 students.

Temasek Cares - Therapy Outreach Programme for Pre-Schoolers (TOPPS): Temasek Cares partnered with the Society for the Physically Disabled to launch the Therapy Outreach Programme for Pre-Schoolers (TOPPS) to moderate their development delays, help them manage their disorder, and progress to mainstream primary schools.

Rebuilding Lives

Temasek Cares - Employment Support Services: Temasek Cares partnered with the Singapore Anglican Community Services  to launch the Employment Support Services programme, which helps individuals recovering from mental illness to gain employment and to reintegrate into society.

The Yellow Ribbon Fund - Temasek Cares STAR Award: Temasek Cares partnered with The Yellow Ribbon Fund  to launch the STAR Award programme, which offers bursaries to financially needy ex-offenders for vocational training to help them gain employment.

Youth Reach: Temasek Cares partnered with the Singapore Association for Mental Health (SAMH) in response to a lack of community-based support for children and youth with mental challenges. to launch the Youth Reach Programme, which helps children and youths with mental illness to cope with their illness and to reintegrate into society. Temasek Cares provided funding to enhance the programme with a mentorship component and a 24-hour helpline.

Crisis Shelter Services for Abused Women and Children: Temasek Cares partnered with the Casa Raudha Women Home  to provide Crisis Shelter Services for Singaporeans and permanent residents who are abused women (between 21 and 60 years old) and their children (under 21 years old for girls and under 12 years old for boys). This programme aims to help 375 abused women and their children over two years to be free from the immediate source of abuse and helps them explore options to rebuild their lives.

Temasek Cares - Programme to Engage Parents of At-risk Students: Temasek Cares partnered with the NorthLight School to launch a programme that helps at-risk students to build familial bonds and overcome challenges in their homes.

Temasek Cares - Programme to Provide Continuing Support for Graduates: Temasek Cares partnered with the NorthLight School to launch a programme that provides continuing support for NorthLight graduates to help them adjust to their new school or work environment.

Temasek Cares - EQUAL (Equine-Assisted Learning): Temasek Cares partnered with the Equestrian Federation of Singapore to launch the Temasek Cares - EQUAL pilot programme that helps over 500 youth a year between 13 and 18 years old from NorthLight School and Assumption Pathway School to learn life and vocational skills through horse-riding and caring for the horses. The pilot programme runs for three years and is co-funded by Temasek Cares, TrailBlazer Foundation, and T-Touch.

References

2009 establishments in Singapore
Foundations based in Singapore
Non-profit organisations based in Singapore
Temasek Holdings